Jan Hajič is a Czech computational linguist and the former director of the Institute of Formal and Applied Linguistics at the Charles University in Prague, from which he also holds a PhD degree. He specializes in empirical NLP, machine translation, speech recognition and creating of treebanks.

References

External links 
Čechům byl zpřístupněn unikátní archiv o holocaustu (Czech Radio) 

Linguists from the Czech Republic
Academic staff of Charles University
Living people
Year of birth missing (living people)
Computational linguistics researchers
Natural language processing researchers